Allium siculum (syn. Nectaroscordum siculum), known as honey garlic, Sicilian honey lily, Sicilian honey garlic, or Mediterranean bells, is a European and Turkish species of plants genus Allium. It is native to the regions around the Mediterranean and Black Seas, and grown in other regions as an ornamental and as a culinary herb.

Description 
It has showy clusters of gracefully drooping bell-shaped blossoms produced in May to early June sitting atop a tall green stem, to 1.2 m in height. The florets (blossoms), suspended on long drooping pedicels, are cream colored with a maroon streak down each petal, have white flared tips, and are tinted green at the base. The blossoms are followed by decorative, erect seed pods in late summer. The blue-gray foliage is triangular in cross-section and strongly twisting along the length of the ascending leaves. A penetrating, skunky odor is released when the plant is cut.

Distribution and habitat
Allium siculum is native to Turkey, Crimea, Greece, Bulgaria, Romania, southern France including Corsica, and Italy (Basilicata, Abruzzo, Umbria, Toscana, Sicily, Sardinia), growing in damp, shady woods.

Taxonomy
Allium siculum is a member of a small subgenus Nectaroscordum of Allium, which consists of only this species and Allium tripedale.

A. siculum comprises two subspecies:
 Allium siculum subsp. dioscoridis (Sm.) K.Richt. (Syn. Allium bulgaricum (Janka) Prodán, Allium dioscoridis Sm., Allium meliophilum Juz.,Nectaroscordum bulgaricum Janka, Nectaroscordum dioscoridis Sm., Nectaroscordum meliophilum (Juz.) Stank., Nectaroscordum siculum subsp. bulgaricum (Janka) Stearn) - native to Greece, Turkey, Bulgaria, Romania, Crimea, introduced in Great Britain
 Allium siculum subsp. siculum - native to France (including Corsica), Italy (including Sardinia and Sicily)

Uses

Ornamental 
Allium siculum is grown as an ornamental in flower gardens. It has showy, drooping blossoms, with each umbel (clusters of flowers on stalks originating in the same place) having up to 30 individual flowers, which are white, pink, and green in colour. Although the flowers initially face downwards, they turn to face upwards just before forming seedheads. It also has unusual twisted foliage. Unlike the majority of other Allium species, A. siculum grows well in shade.

Culinary 
In Bulgaria, the leaves of Allium siculum subsp. dioscoridis, which is known by the vernacular names 'samardala' and 'Bulgarian honey garlic', are used in the preparation of spice mixes and salts, and as a seasoning.

Properties

Lachrymatory agents 
Similarly to onions when chopped, if Allium siculum is crushed it gives off chemicals that make the eyes water, which are termed 'lachrymatory agents'. The lachrymatory agent (Z)-butanethial S-oxide, along with several 1-butenyl thiosulfinates are detected by mass spectrometry using a DART ion source. (Z)-Butanethial S-oxide (the higher homolog of syn-propanethial-S-oxide, the onion lachrymatory agent) isolated from the plant was shown to be identical to a synthetic sample. The precursor to the lachrymatory compound, (RS,RC)-(E)-S-(1-butenyl) cysteine S-oxide (homoisoalliin), was isolated from homogenates of A. siculum, and a closely related species, Allium tripedale, and fully characterized.

A. siculum is not eaten by grazing animals, such as deer; this is thought to be because of its garlic-like smell.

Toxicity 
A. siculum may be toxic to cats and dogs. In other Allium species, this toxicity has been attributed to the presence of organosulphur compounds which induce haemolysis, resulting in haemolytic anaemia.

References 

siculum
Herbs
Edible plants
Flora of Europe
Garden plants of Europe